KOG Co., better known as KOG Studios, is a South Korean game development company based in Daegu. They specialize in producing online free-to-play games, and currently publish the side-scrolling action MMORPG, Elsword and the early access action MMORPG, KurtzPel: Bringer of Chaos. They have also developed the game Grand Chase.

History 

KOG Co. was founded on May 1, 2000. Their first game, Grand Chase, an action side-scrolling MMORPG, launched in August 2003. After being a large success in South Korea, the game expanded to mainland China and Japan, as well as the Americas in 2006. It was notable for reaching mass popularity in South America, breaking the record of most played online game in Brazil. Ntreev Soft began publishing Grand Chase for North America in early 2008. KOG ceased support for the game in 2015, 12 years after its initial release.

In 2010, KOG Studios partnered with Philippine company Level Up! Games, the publisher of Grand Chase in South America, to found Kill3r Combo, a subsidiary company headquartered in Irvine, California, with the objective of bringing KOG's games to North America. Their first game was Elsword, which began open beta testing in North America on April 27, 2011, and released on July 2, 2014.

In June 2012, KOG Studios purchased LevelUp!’s interest in Kill3rCombo to become the sole owner, and officially changed the company's name to KOG Games Inc. Since then, KOG Games has been responsible for publishing their games in the Americas.

Although Elsword received some criticism for pay to win systems, the game was generally well-received, and peaked with 2,500 active players on Steam in August 2013.

KurtzPel Bringer of Chaos was first announced in the South Korean game exhibition G-Star 2017, and entered worldwide Steam early access on April 30, 2019.

KOG Games 

KOG Games (previously as Kill3r Combo from 2010 to 2012) is a subsidiary company of KOG Co., and since 2012, publishes games from KOG in the Americas. It is headquartered in Irvine, California and currently publishes Elsword and KurtzPel on the Steam store. KOG Games also briefly published HeroWarz, a MMORPG developed by A.Storm, in July 2016, but the servers were closed a few months later.

Games

References

External links
 

Video game development companies
Companies based in Daegu
Video game companies established in 2000
Video game companies of South Korea
South Korean companies established in 2000